The 2016 O'Byrne Cup was a Gaelic football competition played by the teams of Leinster GAA. The competition differs from the Leinster Senior Football Championship as it also features further education colleges and the winning team does not progress to another tournament at All-Ireland level.

Meath were the winners.

Format
16 teams compete: 11 county teams (all those of Leinster except Kilkenny) and 5 third-level teams: DIT, UCD, IT Carlow, DCU and Maynooth University.

The teams are drawn into 4 groups of 4 teams each. Each team plays the other teams in its group once, earning 2 points for a win and 1 for a draw. The four group winners progress to the semi-finals.

Group A

Group B

Louth are placed ahead of Kildare because they won the head-to-head game between the teams.

Group C

Group D

Semi-finals

Final

References

O'Byrne Cup
O'Byrne Cup